Some Chaperone is a 1915 silent film comedy short produced and directed by Al Christie. It was produced by Christie along with the Nestor Film Company. It starred Betty Compson and Harry Rattenberry. Universal Film Manufacturing Company distributed.

Cast
Harry Rattenberry - Old Man
Betty Compson - Betty, 1st Daughter
Ethel Lynne - Ethel, 2nd Daughter
Eddie Lyons - Eddie, The Secretary
Lee Moran - Lee, The Chaperone

See also
Betty Compson filmography

References

External links
 Some Chaperone at IMDb.com

1915 films
Films directed by Al Christie
American black-and-white films
Universal Pictures short films
American silent short films
Silent American comedy films
1915 comedy films
1910s American films